The Terror Within is a 1989 American science fiction horror film directed by Thierry Notz and starring George Kennedy, Andrew Stevens, Starr Andreeff and Terri Treas. It was followed by a sequel in 1991, The Terror Within II, with Stevens reprising his starring role while also handling the film's writing and directing duties.

Plot
In a post-apocalyptic future, human survivors are fighting a group of mutant monsters they refer to as "Gargoyles".

Two of these survivors Michael and John are out surveying the world after a chemical or biological attack which left a large portion of the population mutated or dead.  The survivors are part of the Mojave Lab and have lost contact with their sister Rocky Mountain Lab.

Over the radio Sue and David hear John and Michael fall under attack from the gargoyles while investigating a large group of buzzards.  In order to find John and Michael, David and Sue go out of the bunker but find John and Michael dead.  They also find an injured girl named Karen who they bring back to their bunker.

While under anesthesia Karen gives birth to a gargoyle which gets loose in the bunker.  Hal develops a plan to kill the gargoyle in which Andre and Neil fall prey to the gargoyle.  The gargoyle then proceeds to wound David and injure his dog Butch while also kidnapping Sue with the intentions to reproducing with her.

These creatures reproduce quickly by raping human women and impregnating them.  The gestation period is short and deadly.  The creatures are very strong and able to heal after some wounds such as burning, beating, and electrical shock.  They are vulnerable to the high-pitched frequency of a dog whistle (used by a lead character to ward them off).

Sue becomes impregnated by the gargoyle; she later accidentally kills herself while trying to abort the fetus herself.  Linda and David then hatch a plan to kill the gargoyle by luring him into the ventilation system where he becomes trapped and falls into a running exhaust fan dismembering him.  David and Linda re-establish radio contact with the Rocky Mountain Lab and along with Butch leave the bunker with a high frequency megaphone to brave the outside world.  They lie in wait for a number of gargoyles to enter the open bunker and implode it.

It is implied that the survivors are on their way to the Rocky Mountain Lab. Abortion becomes a topic of debate between the humans when one of the characters is raped by one of the creatures; they are unsure if the woman is pregnant by her human partner or the monster.

Cast
 George Kennedy as Hal
 Andrew Stevens as David
 Starr Andreeff as Sue
 Terri Treas as Linda
 John LaFayette as Andre
 Tommy Hinkley as Neil
 Yvonne Saa as Karen
 Joseph Hardin as Michael
 Al Guarino as John
 Roren Sumner as Gargoyle
 Joal Corso as Gargoyle #2
 Butch Stevens as Butch

Production
The movie launched a long-running collaboration between Corman and Andy Stevens.

Release
The Terror Within was given a limited release theatrically in the United States by Concorde Pictures in January 1989.  It grossed $858,591 at the box office. The film was released on VHS the same year by MGM Home Entertainment. In 2010, Shout! Factory released the film on DVD, packaged as a double feature with Dead Space, as part of the Roger Corman's Cult Classics collection.

During a screening of the film in Austin, Texas, a teenager brought a gun to the theater and shot her friend in the head as an April Fools' Day joke.

Critical response
Joe Bob Briggs called The Terror Within "a pretty decent new flick ... . This movie should be required viewing for every member of the Supreme Court. We're talking 17 dead bodies. No breasts. Snake-eating. Bloody fetus monster. Multiple throat-slashing. Giant gargoyle rape. One self-abortion. Exploding sheds. Exploding gargoyles. Gratuitous monster abortion scene, the best one since It's Alive. Buzzard Fu. Crossbow Fu."

The Los Angeles Times said the film "comes out emphatically in support of a woman's right to terminate a pregnancy, if not in all instances, at least in cases of rape by a gooey 9-foot-tall mutant ... the only way to enjoy this [film] ... is to savor star George Kennedy's badly synced post-production dialogue and think back to his role in the sci-fi cheapie movie-within-the-movie in Albert Brooks' Modern Romance, which was full of hilarious bits about the perils of film dubbing. Nine years later, thanks to producer Roger Corman, Kennedy really is in that movie."

See also

Reproduction and pregnancy in speculative fiction

References

External links
 
 
 

1989 horror films
American science fiction horror films
1980s science fiction horror films
1989 films
American pregnancy films
American body horror films
1980s monster movies
American monster movies
Films directed by Thierry Notz
Films produced by Roger Corman
1980s English-language films
1980s American films
Films set in bunkers